Charles Patrick Pierce (born December 28, 1953) is an American sportswriter, political blogger, liberal pundit author, and game show panelist.

Biography
Pierce graduated from St. John's High School in Shrewsbury, Massachusetts, and from Marquette University in Journalism (1975).

Pierce's first job was as a forest ranger for the Commonwealth of Massachusetts. He wrote for Worcester Magazine in the 1970s, where he covered the Blizzard of 1978. In the 1980s and '90, he was a staff reporter for the Boston Phoenix and, later, a sports columnist for the Boston Herald.

Pierce is currently the lead political blogger for Esquire, a position he has held since September 2011. He also wrote for ESPN's Grantland. He has also written for The New York Times, the Los Angeles Times, the Chicago Tribune, the Boston Globe Sunday magazine, the Milwaukee Journal-Sentinel, Sports Illustrated, The National Sports Daily, GQ, and the e-zine Slate as well as the Media Matters blog Altercation, hosted by historian/pundit Eric Alterman.

Pierce makes appearances on radio as a regular contributor to NPR programs Only A Game and Wait Wait...Don't Tell Me!.  Recently Pierce has begun making weekly appearances on the Stephanie Miller Show. He represented the Globe on several occasions on ESPN's Around the Horn and often co-hosts with Bob Ryan on NESN's Globe 10.0.

Publications 
Pierce has written four books:
Sports Guy (2000) 
Hard to Forget: An Alzheimer's Story (2000) 
Moving the Chains: Tom Brady and the Pursuit of Everything (2006)  
Idiot America: How Stupidity Became a Virtue in the Land of the Free (2009)

References

External links

 
 The Politics Blog with Charles P. Pierce

1953 births
Living people
American male bloggers
American bloggers
American political writers
The Boston Globe people
Chicago Tribune people
Esquire (magazine) people
Los Angeles Times people
Place of birth missing (living people)
The New York Times writers
Marquette University alumni
Writers from Worcester, Massachusetts
Sportswriters from New York (state)
Sportswriters from Massachusetts